Bryon Kiefer (born 31 March 1986 in Groningen) is a Dutch footballer of Moluccan descent who played for Eerste Divisie club SC Veendam during the 2006-2009 football seasons.

References

1986 births
Living people
Dutch footballers
Footballers from Groningen (city)
SC Veendam players
Eerste Divisie players

Association footballers not categorized by position
Dutch people of Moluccan descent